The High-Tech Gründerfonds (or HTGF) is a public-private venture capital investment firm based in Bonn, Germany. High-Tech Gründerfonds is an early stage seed investor, focused on high potential high-tech start-ups. The seed financing is provided to allow start-ups to take their ideas through the prototyping phase up to the market launch. Usually, High-Tech Gründerfonds invests about €600,000 in the seed stage and up to a total of €3 million per portfolio company in later rounds.

High-Tech Gründerfonds is a public–private partnership. Investors include the Federal Ministry of Economics and Technology, the KfW Banking Group owned by the federal government, and 39 industrial groups of ALTANA, BASF, B.Braun, Robert Bosch, BÜFA, CEWE, Deutsche Post DHL, Dräger, Drillisch AG, EVONIK, EWE AG, Haniel, Hettich, Knauf, Körber, LANXESS, media + more venture Beteiligungs GmbH & Co. KG, PHOENIX CONTACT, Postbank, QIAGEN, RWE Generation SE, SAP, Schufa, Schwarz Gruppe, STIHL, Thüga, Vector Informatik und WACKER. In March 2012, Evonik also invested  €2.5 million in the fund. High-Tech Gruenderfonds has about €886 million under management in three funds (€272 million HTGF I, €304 million HTGF II and €310 million in HTGF III).

Investments
High-Tech Gründerfonds has approximately 490 companies in its portfolio, including Trademob, a mobile app marketing platform, 6Wunderkinder, the company behind Wunderlist and Wunderkit, fruux, a cross-platform synchronization service, AYOXXA Biosystems, a protein multiplexing company based in Cologne, Boston and Singapore, Mister Spex, a large German online retailer for glasses, plista, a recommendation platform, and SimScale, a web-based simulation platform.

References

External links

Portfolio companies

Venture capital firms of Germany